Robert Alexander (1752 – 14 July 1827) was an Anglo-Irish politician. 

Alexander was the Member of the Parliament for Dingle in the Irish House of Commons from 1777 to 1783. He then represented Newtownards between 1798 and 1800, shortly before the seat's disenfranchisement under the Acts of Union 1800.

References

1752 births
1827 deaths
18th-century Anglo-Irish people
19th-century Anglo-Irish people
Irish MPs 1776–1783
Irish MPs 1798–1800
Members of the Parliament of Ireland (pre-1801) for County Down constituencies
Members of the Parliament of Ireland (pre-1801) for County Kerry constituencies